Estefanía Lima Díaz (born 11 May 1989), sportingly known as Estefa, is a Spanish footballer who plays as a midfielder for Primera División club Villarreal.

References

External links
 
 Profile at La Liga 
 

1989 births
Living people
Sportspeople from Badajoz
Footballers from Extremadura
Spanish women's footballers
Women's association football midfielders
Santa Teresa CD players
Sporting Plaza de Argel players
Villarreal CF (women) players
Primera División (women) players
Spain women's youth international footballers